is Japanese pop group Perfume's ninth single. It was released on February 14, 2007.

Fan Service [sweet] was the group's first single for the year 2007. The release date coincided with Valentine's Day, a theme present in the song "Chocolate Disco". It was issued in special packaging containing a DVD with music videos and a 20-page booklet, and only a limited number of pressings were produced. Both songs were included in the group's album GAME, released the next year.

"Chocolate Disco" has been referred to by young people as a "traditional Valentine's Day song".

Track listing

CD 
Both songs written, composed and arranged by Yasutaka Nakata.
 "Chocolate Disco"
 "Twinkle Snow Powdery Snow"

DVD 
 "Chocolate Disco" -Video Clip-
 "Twinkle Snow Powdery Snow" -Video Clip-

References 

2007 singles
Perfume (Japanese band) songs
2007 songs
Songs written by Yasutaka Nakata
Song recordings produced by Yasutaka Nakata